Virasoro can refer to:

People
 Miguel Ángel Virasoro (philosopher) (1900–1966)
 Miguel Ángel Virasoro (physicist) (1940–2021)

Places
 Gobernador Virasoro, a city in Argentina

Science and mathematics
 Virasoro algebra in mathematics and physics
 Virasoro conjecture in mathematics
 Virasoro element of a vertex operator algebra
 Virasoro minimal model in physics